Bonifacio High Street is a mixed-use development in Bonifacio Global City, Taguig, Metro Manila, Philippines located just near Serendra, Market! Market! and SM Aura Premier. It is owned by Ayala Malls, a real-estate subsidiary of Ayala Land, which is an affiliate of Ayala Corporation. It opened the main development in 2007, High Street Central in 2012, Central Square in 2014 and it is one of Ayala Corporation's flagship projects. The mall offers a mix of high-end retail shops, restaurants, amenities, leisure and entertainment in the Philippines. Currently, the mall has four sections: the first and second blocks are an open-air shopping, the third block is a mixture of open-air and indoor commercial buildings dubbed as the “Bonifacio High Street Central” that also includes state-of-the-art cinemas, and the fourth block named Bonifacio High Street South or simply High Street South is a mixture of open-air and indoor commercial-residential buildings.

Ayala Malls One Bonifacio High Street
Opened in August 2018, Ayala Malls One Bonifacio High Street serves as the podium of the 63-story The Suites at One Bonifacio High Street residential tower and the Philippine Stock Exchange Tower, which opened in February. It is located in front of BHS Central and across Shangri-La at The Fort.

The Landmark Bonifacio Global City at Three Parkade
Opened in October 2021, The Landmark is located at first two levels of Three Parkade, a parking facility adjacent to Central Square. It is the 5th Store opened by The Landmark and is the smallest store. Landmark Supermarket is located on the first level, while Landmark Department Store is on the upper level. The department store features its signature Homeware Section and small Cosmetics Section.

Bonifacio High Street South

The Bonifacio High Street South is a residential-commercial block which is a part of the bigger Bonifacio High Street Complex. It houses two condominium buildings called The Maridien, similar to the nearby Serendra while facing the Bonifacio High Street Main blocks. Also there will be a series of landscaped parks and commercial buildings that would comprise the block. It draws big inspiration from boutique districts of New York City, Los Angeles, Toronto, Kuala Lumpur, Singapore, Hong Kong, Tokyo, and Seoul to name a few.

Anchor Stores
Globe Telecom
The Marketplace
The Landmark
Fully Booked
Toby's Arena
Ayala Malls Cinemas

Gallery

References

External links
Bonifacio High Street Official website

 Bonifacio High Street
 Stores in Bonifacio High Street
 Bonifacio High Street South
 Bonifacio High Street

Buildings and structures in Taguig
Shopping districts and streets in Metro Manila
Mixed-use developments in Metro Manila
Tourist attractions in Metro Manila
Bonifacio Global City
Ayala Malls
Shopping malls established in 2007